Occipital nerve may refer to:

 Greater occipital nerve
 Lesser occipital nerve
 Third occipital nerve